Allium sabulosum is a Eurasian species of wild onion native to European Russia, Kazakhstan, Kyrgyzstan, Iran, Tajikistan, Turkmenistan, Uzbekistan and Xinjiang.

Allium sabulosum produces one egg-shaped bulb up to 20 mm in diameter. Scape is up to 60 cm tall. Leaves are tubular, shorter than the scape. Umbel is densely packed with many green flowers.

References

sabulosum
Onions
Flora of South European Russia
Flora of Central Asia
Flora of Iran
Flora of Xinjiang
Plants described in 1838
Taxa named by Alexander von Bunge